Dive: The Medes Islands Secret is a video game developed by Spanish studios Cosmonaut Games and Over the Top Games. It was first released via Wiiware in the United States on July 26, 2010 and on July 30, 2010 it was released in Europe. The game takes place in the Medes Islands area.

Reception

The game received "average" reviews according to the review aggregation website Metacritic.

References

2010 video games
WiiWare games
Wii-only games
Wii games
Scuba diving video games
Video games developed in Spain